The Mercedes-Benz W123 is a range of executive cars produced by German manufacturer Mercedes-Benz from November 1975 to January 1986. The W123 models surpassed their predecessor, the Mercedes-Benz W114, as the most successful Mercedes, selling 2.7 million units before production ended in the autumn of 1985 for the saloon/sedan versions and January 1986 for coupés and estates/station wagons.

Following a slow production build-up during the first year, customers who placed their orders faced a lengthy waiting period of nine to twelve months. A black market emerged for the customers who were willing to pay more for immediate delivery. The slightly used W123 commanded about 5,000 Deutsche Mark premium over its original sale price.

Like its predecessors, the W123 gained the reputation of being well built and reliable. Many taxi companies chose the W123, and they were a common sight in Germany. Reaching 500,000 or 1,000,000 km with only minor mechanical issues was common with W123s used as taxicabs. Once the W123 reached the end of its service life, they were often shipped to Africa and third world countries where they were highly esteemed for their ability to travel on rough roads and to not require frequent maintenance.

W123 production ended in January 1986 with 63 final T-models rolling out. The most popular single models were the 240 D (455,000 built), the 230 E (442,000 built), and the 200 D (378,000 built).

Design 
The W123 shares technical similarities with its predecessors including engines, steering system, and suspension system. The design is updated with styling cues from its larger sibling, Mercedes-Benz W116, namely wider ribbed taillights, horizontal headlamps, front turn signal indicators on the outer edge, and pull-to-open door handles. The interior is revised with a larger instrument panel, central round ventilation outlets, HVAC (Heating Ventilation Air Conditioning) control panel and a single row of control switches in the centre.

The instrument panel has three large gauges placed behind a single plastic cover. The manual HVAC control panel has three large dials with the left and right for individual temperature control and the centre dial for fan speed control. Air flow is controlled by two sliders (left for upper zone and right for lower zone). If the optional air conditioning unit was ordered, a temperature roll dial was fitted to the row of control switches. The automatic HVAC control panel is simplified with a single roll disc on the left for temperature control, a row of push buttons in the middle for directing the air flow and switching the system on and off and a vertical set of buttons on the right for controlling the fan speed and switching automatic control on and off.

All models except the 280, 280 E, and coupé feature larger round headlamps with smaller round fog lamps with large glass plate covering the entire headlamp housing and acting as a diffusing lens. This setup is the same for North American models with the sealed beam units and glass plate partially covering the headlamp housing. The 280, 280 E, and coupé models use large rectangular headlamps with round fog lamps. The headlamp washers and wipers set are optional.

Nomenclatures 
Per Mercedes-Benz tradition (prior to the 1994 change), model designation corresponded to the engine displacement, chassis type (coupé or estate/station wagon), fuel type (for diesel engines only), and availability of fuel injection system (for petrol engines only):

C for Coupé
T for Tourismus und Transport (estate/station wagon)

No designation was given for the long-wheelbase: it was simply called "Lang" (long) in the brochures and order forms.

D for Diesel
E for Einspritzung (fuel injection)

When the diesel engine is turbocharged, TURBODIESEL is affixed to the right side of the boot lid.

As for the chassis codes, W123 is the saloon/sedan, S123 the estate/station wagon, C123 the coupé, V123 the long-wheelbase saloon/sedan a.k.a. Lang, and F123 refers to the bare long-wheelbase chassis as used for ambulances and other conversions.

Model variations

Saloon (W123)
The four-door version went on sale on 29 January 1975.

Coupé (C123)
In the spring of 1977, a coupé version was introduced on a shortened wheelbase ( versus  for the saloon). The C123 was available as 230 C (later 230 CE) and as 280 C and 280 CE in most markets. Unlike the W123 saloon, the rectangular headlamps were fitted to the C123 regardless of engine type.

Limousine (V123)
From August 1976, a long-wheelbase version with seating for seven to eight was produced. The limousine was built on a stretched W123 saloon/sedan chassis with lower side panels from the coupé behind the rear passenger doors. The elongated roof has the same C-pillar form as on the saloon/sedan. The rear passenger doors were custom-designed in rectangular shape and of the same length as the ones on the saloon/sedan. The engine options were 250, 240 D, and 300 D. A few 280 E limousines were built as special orders.

Chassis (F123)
The stretched limousine version was offered with complete front body clip (B-pillar forward) and strengthened chassis as the base for ambulances or hearses to be built by the conversion specialists such as Binz and Miesen. F stands for Fahrgestelle (chassis).

Estate (S123)
At the 1977 IAA in Frankfurt, the brand's first-ever factory-built estate, S123, was introduced. The letter T in the model designation stood for Tourismus und Transport (Touring and Transport). Previous estates had been custom-built by the coachbuilders, namely Binz. S123 production began in April 1978 at Mercedes-Benz Bremen factory. All engines except the 2-litre version of the M115 were available in the range.

Convertible
While Mercedes-Benz never built its own convertible, they have been built by external companies such as Crayford in the UK, who built the St. Tropez models, and also by Niko-Michaels in New York, USA. In the city of Hagen, Germany, until 2016 one small family owned firm- Baehr, have produced cabrio versions of the C123 Coupe models, and also sold kits for cabrio conversions of the same model.

Engine
All engines from the W114/W115 are carried over. The single new engine was the SOHC 2.5-litre M123 inline six. The 3-litre, five-cylinder diesel engine received a proper nomenclature for the W123, matching the engine displacement: 300 D instead of 240 D 3.0 on the previous W114/W115.

In June 1980, the new M102 four-cylinder inline petrol engine replaced the M115. The 2-litre version was only available with a carburetor while the 2.3-litre version was available with fuel injection only. The carbureted version of 2.8-litre M110 engine in the 280 and 280 C was discontinued in 1981 leaving the 250 as the sole carbureted six-cylinder inline engine.

The world's first turbocharged diesel engine for a passenger vehicle, the OM617 A, was finally introduced in W123 models in September 1979, exclusive to the 300 TD TURBODIESEL for the European market. The same engine was offered in North America and Japan in 1981 as the 300 D TURBODIESEL, 300 CD TURBODIESEL, and 300 TD TURBODIESEL. 

The engines in the W123 were mounted with small shock absorbers in addition to industry standard motor mounts to reduce felt vibration and a provide a smoother ride. These designs were carried over from previous chassis models like the W114/W115.

Road Race

One notable achievement was in the  1977 London–Sydney Marathon road race, where the 280E won first and second, ahead of the third and fourth place Citroën CX.

North American sales

For the North American market, C123 (coupé) was available with both petrol (280 CE) and naturally aspirated diesel (300 CD) until 1981. For 1982 model year, 280 CE was dropped, and 300 CD TURBODIESEL was introduced as a sole engine offering for coupé model.

The estate/station wagon was available with a 3-litre five-cylinder inline OM617 diesel engine only. The naturally aspirated 300 TD was sold for two years (1979-1980) until the turbocharged 300 TD TURBODIESEL replaced it from autumn 1980 because consumers found the 300 TD to be too heavy and too slow with the less powerful engine. 300 TD TURBODIESEL preceded 300 D TURBODIESEL and 300 CD TURBODIESEL by a few months.

The petrol engines (230, 280 E, and 280 CE) were offered from 1976 to 1980 model years. From 1981 until 1985, W123 models were sold only with diesel engines to comply with the federal regulation on corporate average fuel economy (CAFE) without paying heavy penalties. The American consumers also preferred the diesel engines for lower fuel consumption after two oil crises and fuel shock of 1973 and 1979.

Four-speed manual gearboxes were offered with four-cylinder inline engines (2.3-litre M115 petrol and 2.4-litre OM616 Diesel) only. The new 5-speed manual gearboxes were never offered by Mercedes-Benz itself on the North American market.

The North American version of W123 differs from European version due to the US Department of Transportation automotive regulations along with Environmental Protection Agency (EPA) automotive emission control regulations. Autoweek writes "the visual changes were on the mild side" compared to U.S. Models of the Mercedes-Benz R107 and Mercedes-Benz W116, which have been described by journalists as if a "beautiful car was beaten with the malaise ugly stick."

Notable exterior differences included
 Larger and stronger bumpers that resist collision damage up to 5 mph  
 Round sealed beam headlamp capsules and fog lamps; the large glass covers partially the housing. The fog lamps had clear lens until 1980 model year when they were tinted yellow
 Amber-coloured retroreflective markers on the front turn signal indicators which double as night illumination
 Red-coloured retroreflective markers at side edge of taillamps 
 Location of ID-tag on A-pillar
 Emission control device for petrol engines only
 Radio with different frequency steps when tuning to different radio stations
 85 mph maximum speedometer with 55 mph prominently marked
 Tinted glass band across the top of front windscreen
 If passenger side external rear view mirror is included, the mirror must carry the warning: "Vehicles are closer than they appear"

Equipment and features
The standard and optional features are numerous along with a large number of engine and gearbox options.  Customers could choose cloth, MB-Tex vinyl, velour or leather for the upholstery as well as interior wood trim for dashboard and centre console. The paint and interior colour palettes are extensive as well.

The driving dynamic enhancement options for extra cost became more extensive over the time: ABS (from August 1980 onward), self-locking differential gear, five-speed manual gearbox (introduced in 1982 for European markets only), Tempomat cruise control system, power steering system (standard from 1982 onward), passenger-side external rear view mirror (standard on S123 model), "Alpine" horn with selectable loudness (popular in Switzerland due to strict noise regulations), retractable steering column (from 1982 onward) and so forth.

The extra cost options for creature comforts includes power windows (with a cut-off switch for the rear passenger door windows), vacuum-powered central locking system, sunroof (manual and electric), air conditioning system (manual or automatic control), seats with orthopaedic support, electrically heated seats (all seats were individually ordered), pre-heating system (for heating the passenger compartment at a pre-selected time when the engine is not running), an assortment of different radios with and without cassette players, rear seat head rests, etc. The W123s destined for the North American market tended to have more features as standard, reflecting the American customer's preference for luxury accessories. For the first time in an executive saloon from Mercedes-Benz, the W123 had the option of fully automatic climate control at extra cost. This option was popular in the North American and Japanese markets. A rare option was a column gear selector that could be ordered with an automatic gearbox if the customer wished. The most expensive option was the Becker radio telephone, selling for 13,512 Deutsche Mark.

In the estate/station wagon model, a third row rear-facing foldable seat was offered as an extra cost option.

Updates
Mercedes-Benz updated the W123 in incremental steps, calling them series:
Series 0.5, November 1975 – July 1976
First Series, August 1976 – July 1979
Second Series, August 1979 – August 1982
Third Series, September 1982 – January 1986

Changes to the second series (from August 1979):
smaller steering wheel (10 mm) in a more elegant design
modernized toggle switches with smoother edges (hazard lights, windows, etc.)
pneumatic headlamp leveling system
modified belt buckles and smaller headrests
new fabric patterns for the seats

Changes to the third series (from September 1982):
Rectangular headlights and power steering as standard for entire model range
Molded front seat backrests for more knee freedom in the rear
Cloth insert in the door panels
Zebrano wood paneling in the dashboard
Reduced wind noise due to improved roof trim strips
Ventilation outlets are no longer chrome-plated
Driver's airbag available as optional equipment

For the 1981 model year, the automatic climate control panel from the W126 S-Class with a simplified icon design was adopted. A new five-speed manual gearbox was introduced in February 1982 and was available in all models except those with the 3-litre turbocharged diesel engine but not in North America. This gearbox was only offered to North America via the grey market.

In September 1982, the driver's airbag with seat belt pre-tensioners for the passenger were offered as a 1,762.80 Deutsche Mark option for all models from the 1983 model year onward. Very few W123s had both driver and passenger air bags. The passenger air bag used a pyrotechnic gas discharge design, a world's first.

Copies
The W123 was officially produced by FAW in China from 1987 until 1988, as a 200 sedan or as a long wheelbase 230E. Only 828 cars were built in their Changchun plant. Another Chinese company called Bamin Automobile made W123 lookalikes using other parts. Bamin was a army-owned company located in Minhou. Their W123 copy was built on the chassis of the Bamin BM212A/213A, a copy of the Beijing BJ212 and came in a few different bodystyles. There was a four-door pickup called the BM2022A (or the better equipped BM1020KHA) and a wagon derived from it, as well as the BM1020KH/BM6480 (proper station wagons). The Chinese copies used the 2.4-litre BJ492 pushrod inline-four engine from the BJ212.

Technical data - Rest of World

Technical data - North America and Japan
In these markets, only the following models were offered:

References

Notes

Bibliography

General

Workshop manuals

External links

W123 buyer's guide – Classics World (UK)
W123 production figures
W123 production information, technical data, and media of the Mercedes-Benz Classic Digital Archive
W123 specifications and prices

W123
W123
Executive cars
Limousines
Sedans
Station wagons
Cars introduced in 1976
1980s cars
Rally cars
Coupés
Rear-wheel-drive vehicles